Eleanor Harvey (born January 14, 1995) is a Canadian foil fencer from Hamilton, Ontario. Harvey won the gold medal at the 2015 Pan American Games in Toronto in the women's team foil event. She is also a former world junior silver medallist in the women's individual foil event.

Early life
Harvey became interested in becoming an Olympian while watching 2000 Sydney Games. She began training for long distance running before turning to karate at eight years ago. She trained karate for two years before realizing that karate was not an Olympic sport at that time. Harvey changed to practice fencing after a family friend heard a radio interview with Sherraine Schalm.

Career
Harvey qualified to represent Canada at the 2016 Summer Olympics by being ranked in the top two in the Americas outside the top 14 rankings. She was coached by Paul ApSimon. At the 2016 Summer Olympics Harvey defeated world number one Arianna Errigo to reach the quarterfinals. Ultimately she finished in seventh place, the highest finish for a Canadian fencer in Olympic history.

Harvey represented Canada at the 2020 Summer Olympics.

She competed at the 2022 World Fencing Championships held in Cairo, Egypt.

See also
List of Canadian sports personalities

References

External links
 

1995 births
Living people
Canadian female fencers
Fencers at the 2015 Pan American Games
Fencers at the 2016 Summer Olympics
Pan American Games gold medalists for Canada
Olympic fencers of Canada
Pan American Games medalists in fencing
Sportspeople from Hamilton, Ontario
Fencers at the 2019 Pan American Games
Medalists at the 2015 Pan American Games
Medalists at the 2019 Pan American Games
Fencers at the 2020 Summer Olympics
21st-century Canadian women